is the second single by J-pop singer Leah Dizon. It was released on May 30, 2007. The regular edition includes a bonus sixfold mini-poster, while the Limited Edition includes a bonus DVD which contains a music video, and making-of footage. To promote the single, the song "Could you be that one?" was featured in the Tecmo commercial for Ninja Gaiden Sigma.

Track listing
 
 "Could you be that one?"

DVD track listing
  (promo video)
 Making-of Footage (video clip)

Charts

Sales and certifications

References

Leah Dizon songs
2007 singles
2007 songs
Victor Entertainment singles